Soul World is a fictional place appearing in American comic books published by Marvel Comics, and created by writer/illustrator, Jim Starlin. Soul World was first alluded to in-story in Strange Tales #179 (1975), and first depicted on-the-page in Warlock Vol 2 #6 (1983). Soul World is described as a “pocket dimension” contained within the plot-motivating Soul Gem, and is depicted as an idyllic alien landscape inhabited by the souls of characters most commonly associated with Starlin's recurrent fictional protagonist, Adam Warlock. Soul World serves the narrative as a place of purgatory for souls "captured" by Warlock.

Fictional depiction
Soul World is featured most often in the Marvel Comics cosmic-based tales Jim Starlin helped revitalize in the 1970s with the re-purposing of the 1960s Stan Lee created character, Him, which Starlin renamed as Adam Warlock. In the early storylines, Warlock was given an enchanted gemstone (the Soul Gem) by the protagonist, the High Evolutionary, which granted Warlock the ability to steal the souls of his enemies. Allusions were made to the captured souls as “residing” within the gem, but it was not until the 1980s death and resurrection of Warlock story-arch when it was revealed that an actual world existed within the gem, inhabited by those captured souls. Starlin illustrated Soul World as a pastoral alien landscape, featuring rolling hills and spiring mountains. The Soul Gem was later retconned to be among the six Infinity Gems comprising the totemic Infinity Gauntlet, though Warlock maintained an intrinsic link to the gem and the world within, the latter of which he often utilized as a place of imprisonment for his enemies, as well as a place of refuge and self-exile for himself and his friends. It was later discovered that while Adam Warlock is considered the god of Soul World, this pocket dimension is actually overseen by an ancient eldritch soul-eating creature known as Devondra, a being with the ability to create new universes from its silk and whose lower half resembles a spider, possess long arms, four digits on each hand, many tentacles on face, multiple eyes and fangs. It was Devondra that caused Soul World to transform from a paradise to a hellish wasteland and was theorized that once Devondra has eaten enough souls, she will spin threads within the Soul Stone in order to birth a new reality. Basically, once the creature is sated the Stone enables its wielder to alter reality, or worse yet, remake it.

Narrative function
Starlin initially used Soul World in his stories to serve as a place of exile and purgatory for a supporting cast of characters most commonly affiliated with his protagonist, Adam Warlock. Warlock is portrayed as being the possessor of the Soul Gem, thereby the de facto god of Soul World. Starlin used Soul World as a place of self-exile for Warlock in that character's death and resurrection storyline. In the 1990s Infinity Gauntlet trilogy - a Starlin created mini-series - the stories show Warlock using Soul World as a place of exile for the defeated antagonists. Other characters, such as Judge Kray-Tor and Captain Autolycus, inhabit Soul World in a type of purgatory for souls that Warlock deems righteous.

In other media

In the 2018 film Avengers: Infinity War, after Thanos snaps his fingers and wipes out half the Universe, he finds himself in what appears to be the Soul World, where a young Gamora questions him on what he has done. However, the Russo brothers refers to this area as a metaphysical "way station", which seems to have retained little to no connection to the Soul World idea.

References

External links
 Marvel Database: List of Appearances of Soul World in Marvel Comics

Fictional dimensions
Fiction about purgatory